Hanna Barbera's Turbo Toons is a racing video game for the Super Nintendo Entertainment System that was released in 1994 in Europe. Despite being rated by the ESRB, the game was not released in North America. A Sega Mega Drive version was planned but never released.

Gameplay
The player has to race Hanna-Barbera characters like Yogi Bear, Top Cat, Huckleberry Hound, along with other classic characters around a simple race track while trying to finish in first place. Levels range from a forest level to an arctic-type level.

Reception
Super Play magazine have the game an overall score of 42 out of 100 criticizing the game being unsubstantial after a half an hour of gameplay since there isn't much to the game and also giving criticism to the repetitive game sound effects concluding “Initially very amusing but, much like that looping background scenery of every Hanna Barbers cartoon, it’s too simple and becomes repetitive far too quickly.”

References

1994 video games
Cancelled Sega Genesis games
Europe-exclusive video games
Racing video games
Super Nintendo Entertainment System games
Super Nintendo Entertainment System-only games
Video games based on Hanna-Barbera series and characters
Video games developed in the United Kingdom
Multiplayer and single-player video games
Video games based on Yogi Bear
Empire Interactive games